WEGA, Wega, or WeGA may refer to:

 WeGA or Carl-Maria-von-Weber-Gesamtausgabe, a scientific-critical edition of the works of the composer Carl Maria von Weber
 WEGA, a German electronics manufacturer, acquired by Sony Corporation
 WEGA (AM) (1350 AM, Candelita7), a radio station licensed to Vega Baja, Puerto Rico
 Wega (horse), a horse participating in 2012 Olympics equestrian events
 WEGA (stellarator), an early version of the Hybrid Illinois Device for Research and Applications
 Wiener Einsatzgruppe Alarmabteilung, a SWAT team in Vienna, Austria
 WEGA – Die Spezialeinheit der Polizei, an Austrian TV series about the Wiener Einsatzgruppe Alarmabteilung
 Wega Industria Aeronautica, Brazilian manufacturer of aircraft including the Wega 180
 , a German fishing trawler in service 1933–39 and 1945–55
 Wega, a station on the Wabern–Brilon Wald railway, North Rhine-Westphalia, Germany
 Waya Island, Fiji, formerly spelled Wega
 FD Trinitron/WEGA, Sony's series of flat picture tubes

See also
 Vega (disambiguation), many senses have Wega as a variant spelling 
 Tony Wegas (born 1965) Austrian singer and actor
 Germanvox–Wega, 1967–70 professional cycling team